Max Carrol Chapman Jr. was the President and CEO of Kidder, Peabody & Co., the investment banking and broker-dealer subsidiary of the parent, Kidder, Peabody Group, Inc.  He also served as President and Chief Operating Officer of the parent company.

Early life and career
Chapman obtained a Bachelor of Arts in Economics from the University of North Carolina at Chapel Hill in 1966 and a Master of Business Administration from Columbia Business School in 1969.  Chapman struggled with dyslexia in high school. His athletic skills, not his grades, brought him to UNC with a football scholarship. Once here, he discovered he could compete as a scholar, too. 

Following graduation from business school, he joined Kidder, Peabody, & Co.  There, he founded the Financial Futures Department and co-founded the High-Yield Bond and Merchant Banking Group.  

In 1987 he was elected as the President and CEO of Kidder, Peabody & Co., the investment banking and broker-dealer subsidiary of the parent, Kidder, Peabody Group, Inc.  At the same time, he was also elected as President and Chief Operating Officer of the parent company. He currently owns many properties and companies throughout the United States, including the Brooks Lake Lodge, Snow King and Spa in Jackson Hole, Wyoming.
In 1989, he joined Nomura Securities, where he served as the Chairman of Nomura Holding America Inc., Managing Director of the Nomura Securities Co., Ltd., and Chairman of Nomura Europe Holding plc.

Philanthropy
Chapman donated $5 million to the University of North Carolina at Chapel Hill to build a new building, which was named Chapman Hall in his honor.

References

Columbia Business School alumni
Living people
University of North Carolina at Chapel Hill alumni
American chief executives of financial services companies
Year of birth missing (living people)